Boris René Lumbana Kapasa (born 19 June 1991) is a Congolese-born Swedish footballer and an alternative pop musician, using the stage name Boris René. Boris is currently playing for the Swedish football team GAIS.

Sports career
Boris Lumbana is a defender who after spending his youth career at the Örebro-based Swedish football team BK Forward, has played professionally in a number of Swedish football clubs. He played for two seasons in the Swedish lower leagues with Örebro SK Ungdom in 2008 to 2010 and for 4 more seasons 2010 to 2014 for the club Örebro SK in the Swedish professional Allsvenskan league. In 2014, he moved to Degerfors IF in the second division Superettan league.

Music career

Boris is also an alternative pop musician, using the stage name Boris René. He used to make music with his brothers from his childhood days. He released his first single "Alive" in 2013. He competed in Melodifestivalen 2016 with the song "Put Your Love on Me". He placed tenth in the final.

He competed in Melodifestivalen 2017 with the song "Her Kiss". In the first semi-final held on 4 February 2017, he came 3/4 and qualified for "Second chance" round. He then won his duel with Dismissed in the Andra Chansen round and then went to the final, which he placed 8th overall in.

Personal life
His older brother Christian Lumbana Kapasa, played football in the Swedish lower leagues with Örebro SK Ungdom and Karlslunds IF, retiring in 2010.

Discography

Singles

References

External links

1991 births
Living people
Footballers from Kinshasa
Association football defenders
Örebro SK players
Allsvenskan players
Superettan players
Swedish footballers
GAIS players
BK Forward players
Swedish expatriate footballers
Swedish expatriate sportspeople in Iceland
Democratic Republic of the Congo emigrants to Sweden
Knattspyrnufélag Akureyrar players
Expatriate footballers in Iceland
21st-century Swedish singers
21st-century Swedish male singers
Melodifestivalen contestants of 2017
Melodifestivalen contestants of 2016